The Keroplatidae are a family of small flies known as fungus gnats. About 950 species are described, but the true number of species is undoubtedly much higher. They are generally forest dwellers found in the damp habitats favoured by their host fungi. They can also often be found in caves.  Larvae both feed on fungi and are predatory - they can spin webs by secreting acid fluids, which they use to kill smaller invertebrates and capture spores. Some of the predatory larvae cannibalize pupa of their own species. 

They notably include the genus Arachnocampa; the larvae of which are known as "glowworms" in Australia and New Zealand. 

The fossil record of the family extends back into the Cretaceous, with the oldest named member, Lebanognoriste known from the Barremian aged Lebanese amber, other Cretaceous species are known from the Spanish, Burmese, Bezonnais, Taimyr and Canadian ambers.

References

External links
Fungus Gnats Online
Diptera.info Images

 
Nematocera families
Taxa named by Camillo Rondani